A general election was held in the U.S. state of Wyoming on Tuesday, November 3, 1914. All of the state's executive officers—the Governor, Secretary of State, Auditor, Treasurer, and Superintendent of Public Instruction—were up for election. Governor Joseph M. Carey declined to seek re-election to a second term, and Democratic State Senator John B. Kendrick was elected as his successor. Republicans, however, won all of the other statewide executive offices, including picking up the Superintendent's office.

Governor

Incumbent Democratic Governor Joseph M. Carey declined to seek re-election to a second term. State Senator John B. Kendrick won the Democratic nomination to succeed Carey unopposed, and faced former U.S. Attorney Hilliard S. Ridgely, the Republican nominee, in the general election. Kendrick defeated Ridgely by a decisive margin, but reduced from Carey's landslide victory four years earlier. Following Kendrick's election to the U.S. Senate in 1916, Secretary of State Frank L. Houx ascended to the governorship.

Secretary of State
Incumbent Democratic Secretary of State Frank L. Houx ran for re-election to a second term. He won the Democratic primary unopposed and faced State Senate President Birney H. Sage, the Republican nominee, and attorney E.C. Raymond, the Progressive nominee, in the general election. Just as Houx's 1910 election was close, so was his re-election; he narrowly defeated Sage to win a second term, prevailing by just 120 votes. During Houx's term, Governor John B. Kendrick would be selected to the Senate, making Houx acting Governor until the 1918 gubernatorial election.

Democratic primary

Candidates
 Frank L. Houx, incumbent Secretary of State

Results

Republican primary

Candidates
 Birney H. Sage, President of the State Senate

Results

Progressive Party primary

Candidates
 E. C. Raymond

Results

General election

Results

Auditor
Incumbent Republican State Auditor Robert B. Forsyth ran for re-election to a second term. He won the Republican primary unopposed and faced Douglas Mayor Campbell H. McWhinnie, the Democratic nominee, and businessman Thomas Blythe, the Progressive nominee. Forsyth won re-election by a wide margin.

Democratic primary

Candidates
 Campbell H. McWhinnie, Mayor of Douglas

Results

Republican primary

Candidates
 Robert B. Forsyth, incumbent State Auditor

Results

Progressive Party primary

Candidates
 M. N. Grant

Results

After M. N. Grant won the Progressive primary for State Auditor, he withdrew from consideration in protest of the Progressive Party's endorsement of John B. Kendrick for Governor. He was replaced on the ballot by Thomas Blythe, an Evanston businessman.

General election

Results

Treasurer
Incumbent Republican State Treasurer Joseph L. Baird was barred from seeking re-election to a second term, creating an open seat. State Representative Herman B. Gates won the Republican primary over W. G. Birkhauser, and advanced to the general election, where he faced Fremont County Treasurer Fred L. Thompson, the Democratic nominee, and W. S. Knittle, the Progressive nominee. Gates narrowly defeated Thompson, winning by just 246 votes, or 0.60% of the vote.

Democratic primary

Candidates
 Fred L. Thompson, Fremont County Treasurer

Results

Republican primary

Candidates
 Herman B. Gates, State Representative from Big Horn County
 W. G. Birkhauser

Results

Progressive Party primary

Candidates
 F. S. Knittle

Results

General election

Results

Superintendent of Public Instruction
Incumbent Democratic Superintendent of Public Instruction Rose Bird declined to seek re-election, creating an open seat. Uinta County Superintendent Iva T. Irish won the Democratic primary unopposed. Edith K. O. Clark, the Sheridan County Superintendent of Schools, narrowly won a crowded Republican primary, and advanced to the general election as Irish's chief opponent. Clark defeated Irish by a decisive margin, picking up the office for the Republican Party.

Democratic primary

Candidates
 Iva T. Irish, Uinta County Superintendent of Schools

Results

Republican primary

Candidates
 Edith K. O. Clark, Sheridan County Superintendent of Schools
 Frances B. Smith, Carbon County Superintendent of Schools
 Thomas B. McDonough, Superintendent of Casper City Schools
 Frank W. Lee, Superintendent of Green River City Schools
 Jessie C. Liston, Principal of the Johnson School

Results

Progressive Party primary

Candidates
 Minnie Williams,

Results

General election

Results

References

 
Wyoming